Rudolf Kárpáti (17 July 1920 – 1 February 1999) was a fencer from Hungary, who won six gold medals in sabre at four Olympic Games (1948–1960). He also won seven gold, three silver and two bronze medals at the world championships. For his achievements he was named Hungarian Sportsman of the year in 1959 and 1960.

Kárpáti graduated from the National Conservatory majoring in the history of music; he was also an accomplished violinist and the artistic director of the People’s Army Central Artistic Ensemble (1961–1986). Besides fencing and music, he was an employee at the Hungarian State Credit Bank and an officer with the Hungarian Army – he retired as Colonel, and later in 1990 was promoted to Major General.

Kárpáti was a member of the Hungarian Fencing Federation from 1961 to 1991. After retiring from competitions, in 1977 he became president of the Budapest Fencing Federation and an administrator with the Fédération Internationale d'Escrime.

See also
List of multiple Olympic gold medalists
List of multiple Olympic gold medalists in one event

References

1920 births
1999 deaths
Hungarian male sabre fencers
Fencers at the 1948 Summer Olympics
Fencers at the 1952 Summer Olympics
Fencers at the 1956 Summer Olympics
Fencers at the 1960 Summer Olympics
Olympic fencers of Hungary
Olympic gold medalists for Hungary
Olympic medalists in fencing
Fencers from Budapest
Recipients of the Olympic Order
Medalists at the 1948 Summer Olympics
Medalists at the 1952 Summer Olympics
Medalists at the 1956 Summer Olympics
Medalists at the 1960 Summer Olympics